Desert hackberry may refer to:
 Celtis ehrenbergiana, a shrub or small tree that grows in dry locations, also called the desert hackberry or spiny hackberry
 Asterocampa leilia, a species of butterfly whose larvae feed on the hackberry